Sandhills Community College is a public community college in Pinehurst, North Carolina. Sandhills was chartered in 1963 and officially opened October 1, 1965. It was the first comprehensive community college authorized and established as the result of legislation passed by the 1963 General Assembly of North Carolina. It is part of the North Carolina Community College System. Sandhills Community College has about 4,000 students enrolled in college-credit curriculum courses and over 11,000 students who take continuing-education courses annually.

History
Shortly after the passage of legislation establishing Sandhills Community College, H. Clifton Blue of Aberdeen, NC, led a group of prominent Moore County, NC, citizens in petitioning the State Board of Education to establish a community college in Moore County. Upon approval of the petition, the citizens of Moore County voted in favor of a $1 million bond issue for capital construction and a tax levy for the maintenance of college facilities.

The first board of trustees meeting occurred on December 4, 1963. On December 27, Dr. Raymond Stone was named the first president of the college. Sandhills was chartered in 1963.

The buildings were designed by local architects Hayes-Howell and Associates, and built on 180 acres donated by Mrs. Mary Luman Meyer. The groundbreaking was in November 1964. Legend has it that Dr. Stone and a few others were having lunch at The Gray Fox in downtown Pinehurst and Stone admired the courtyard of the restaurant (now Theo's Taverna). He requested courtyards be implemented into the design of the college buildings. The palladium windows were said to be inspired by the Boyd House in downtown Southern Pines.

Sandhills Community College officially opened October 1, 1965, with classes being held in nine different temporary locations in the downtown area of Southern Pines. The administrative offices were above Patches Department Store, which is now The Ice Cream Parlor. The college moved to the current location in September 1966.

Dr. John Dempsey assumed the presidency in 1989 and serves to this date.

Administration

Governance 
A board of trustees governs the college and is composed of appointees by the governor, the Moore County Board of Commissioners, and the Moore County Board of Education.

Campus
The college moved to its present location from downtown Southern Pines in March 1966.

The Sandhills Community College campus comprises 13 instructional buildings. Several recent additions to the college campus are Logan Hall, the Dempsey Student Center, Little Hall, and Steed Hall. Owens Auditorium was named to honor the many contributions made to Sandhills Community College by Dr. Francis Leroy Owens, Sr., who served on the Sandhills Community College Board of Trustees for 22 years.  Named for Dr. John Dempsey, the current and only the second president of Sandhills, the Dempsey Student Center houses the college bookstore, areas for study, a gymnasium, a fitness center, locker rooms, a game room, a full-service cafeteria, dining areas, and the Ewing Leadership Center. Outside of the Dempsey Student Center is a basketball court, tennis courts, sports fields, a picnic shelter, walking trails, sand volleyball courts, and a ropes course.

Computer technologies, hospitality and culinary arts, and engineering technologies are taught in the building named in honor of the college's long-time board of trustees chair, George W. Little. In Little Hall, the Charles and Jane Wellard Technology Center houses state-of-the-art computer equipment, and culinary and baking classes are conducted in the Peggy Kirk Bell Center for Hospitality and the Culinary Arts.

Steed Hall houses the landscape gardening program, and humanities, math, and English classes are held in Logan Hall. The Kelly Tutoring Center is located there.

The college is also home to the  Sandhills Horticultural Gardens. Designed and maintained by students in the landscape gardening program, the site contains 14 themed gardens, including a whimsical children's garden and a new Japanese garden. The largest accessible holly collection on the East Coast is found in the Ebersole Holly Garden. A formal English garden exhibits several smaller gardens, including the Holly Maze, the Fountain Courtyard, the Sunken Garden, the Ceremonial Courtyard, and the Herb Garden.

In addition to the main campus, the Hoke Center located in Raeford provides curriculum, continuing-education, and basic job skills courses. It is also home to SandHoke Early College High School. Hoke County is the second county Sandhills Community College serves. The college began teaching in Hoke County in 1968 in the Old County Office Building in downtown Raeford. In 2001, Wyatt and Mary Upchurch donated 10 acres of land for the Sandhills Hoke Center. The first building constructed was named in their honor. Since then, Johnson Hall and SandHoke Hall have been constructed.

The college dedicated the Larry R. Caddell Public Safety Training Center in 2011. It is located in Carthage and is used to train emergency-services personnel. It is also the site of the college's fire academy and many workshops each year during the annual Sandhills Emergency Services Seminar.

Academics

Degree programs
In addition to the university studies college0transfer program, Sandhills Community College offers 34 two-year associate in applied science degrees (AAS). These programs provide the training necessary to permit entry into increasingly complex and sophisticated employment in business, industry, health, and public service. The AAS degree programs combine a solid foundation in general education with specialized knowledge and skills. Certain programs offer 2+2 transferable agreements with several four-year institutions. Degrees from Sandhills are accredited by the Southern Association of Colleges and Schools.

Diploma and certificate programs
Students desiring training in specific areas that require a certificate or diploma have many options from which to choose. These can be earned in a shorter span of time. Refer to the Programs and Majors section of the college's website to view all options.

Sandhills was the first community college in the nation to guarantee that each graduate is competent in his or her area of expertise or the college will retrain the student free of charge.

Continuing education
Continuing-education opportunities are offered to residents of Moore and Hoke Counties for professional and personal interests. Technology training, basic skills, creative living, online courses and certificate programs, career training, career development, public safety, customized training, and the Small Business Center are the divisions of Continuing Education. Classes are held on the main campus in Pinehurst, the Sandhills Hoke Center in Raeford, and the Westmoore Center.

SandHoke Early College High School 
SandHoke Early College High School is a partnership between the Hoke County School System and Sandhills Community College. At the conclusion of the five-year plan of study, graduates receive a high-school diploma from Hoke County schools and an associate of arts degree from Sandhills Community College. "The mission of SandHoke Early College High School is to provide a smaller, more personalized learning community that will prepare all students for a challenging program of study by developing academic rigor, providing relevant coursework, and building student/community relationships." In addition to completing courses required by Hoke County Schools for the high school diploma, students will also complete the required plan of study for the Associate in Arts degree.

Admission to SandHoke Early College High School begins when Hoke County middle0school students are in the eighth grade. Students and their parents complete an application form with Hoke County Schools.

Athletics
The college revived its aathletic program in 2009. It comprises men's and women's golf teams, a women's volleyball team, and a men's basketball team. Competition is through Region X of the NJCAA. The teams are called the "Flyers".

Notable alumni 
Terry Anderson, songwriter and musician
The Fabulous Knobs, rock band consisting of alumni Terry Anderson, Jack Cornell, David Enloe, and Debra DeMilo

References

External links
Official website

Educational institutions established in 1965
Two-year colleges in the United States
North Carolina Community College System colleges
Universities and colleges accredited by the Southern Association of Colleges and Schools
Education in Moore County, North Carolina
Buildings and structures in Moore County, North Carolina
Education in Hoke County, North Carolina
1965 establishments in North Carolina